Cochacucho (possibly from Quechua qucha lake, k'uchu corner, inside corner or outward angle) is a mountain in the Vilcanota mountain range in the Andes of Peru. It is located in the Cusco Region, Canchis Province, San Pablo District, and in the Puno Region, Melgar Province, Nuñoa District. It is situated southwest of the mountains Pomanota and Jatuncucho, and north of the mountain Jatun Sallica.

References

Lakes of Cusco Region
Lakes of Peru

Mountains of Puno Region
Mountains of Cusco Region